Turn Off the News (Build a Garden) is the fifth studio album by American country rock band Lukas Nelson & Promise of the Real. The album was released on June 14, 2019, by Fantasy Records.

Critical reception

Turn Off the News (Build a Garden) received generally positive reviews from critics. At Metacritic, which assigns a normalized rating out of 100 to reviews from critics, the album received an average score of 76, which indicates "generally favorable reviews", based on 10 reviews.

Commercial performance
The album has sold 16,100 copies in the United States as of October 2019.

Track listing

Charts

References

2019 albums
Fantasy Records albums
Albums recorded at Shangri-La (recording studio)